George C. Smith was an American farmer from Oakland, Wisconsin who spent two terms as a member of the Wisconsin State Assembly. He was a Republican.

Background 
He was born in New York state, and was 33 years old when the Assembly session commenced.

Legislature 
He was elected in 1857 from the 2nd Jefferson County district (the Towns of Koshkonong, Oakland, Lake Mills, Aztalan and Jefferson), and re-elected in 1858. He succeeded fellow Republican Jared F. Ostrander, and was succeeded by Charles Hammarquist, another Republican.

References 

Republican Party members of the Wisconsin State Assembly
19th-century American politicians
Farmers from Wisconsin
People from New York (state)